Sultangulovo (Soltanğol) is a rural locality (a village) in Mrakovsky Selsoviet, Kugarchinsky District, Bashkortostan, Russia. The population was 86 as of 2010. There are 3 streets.

Geography 
Sultangulovo is located 7 km north of Mrakovo (the district's administrative centre) by road. Vasilyevsky is the nearest rural locality.

References 

Rural localities in Kugarchinsky District